Benton Jay "Ben" Hall (January 13, 1835 – January 5, 1894) was a one-term Democratic U.S. Representative from Iowa's 1st congressional district in southeastern Iowa.

Born in Mount Vernon, Ohio, Hall moved in December 1840 with his parents (future Iowa Supreme Court justice J.C. Hall and his wife) to Burlington in Iowa Territory.  He attended Knox College, Galesburg, Illinois, and graduated from Miami University, Oxford, Ohio, in 1855.  He studied law with his father, was admitted to the bar in 1857 and practiced in Burlington.  He was a member of the Iowa House of Representatives in 1872 and 1873.  In 1873 he was an unsuccessful candidate for election to the Iowa Supreme Court. He was elected to a four-year term in the Iowa Senate in 1881.

The following year (1882) Hall won the democratic nomination for election to represent Iowa's 1st congressional district in the U.S. House, but was defeated by  the incumbent Republican, Moses A. McCoid.  However, in 1884, Hall ran again for the 1st district seat and prevailed, the first Democrat to take that seat since the outbreak of the Civil War. He served in the Forty-ninth Congress.  However, in 1886 he was defeated in the general election by former Iowa Governor (and future U.S. Senator) John H. Gear. Hall served in Congress from March 4, 1885 to March 3, 1887.

Soon after his defeat, he was appointed Commissioner of Patents by President Cleveland and served from April 12, 1887, to March 31, 1889, and afterwards resumed the practice of law.

He died in Burlington on January 5, 1894.  He was interred in Aspen Grove Cemetery.

References

1835 births
1894 deaths
People from Mount Vernon, Ohio
Miami University alumni
Iowa lawyers
Democratic Party Iowa state senators
Democratic Party members of the Iowa House of Representatives
Knox College (Illinois) alumni
United States Commissioners of Patents
Democratic Party members of the United States House of Representatives from Iowa
19th-century American politicians
19th-century American lawyers